Transwestern Airlines was a regional airline based in Logan, Utah, its hub was at the Salt Lake City International Airport. Founded in 1976, the carrier began service on most of the routes abandoned by Sun Valley Key Airlines. For a period in 1978 and 1979 the airline went by the name of Transwestern Airlines of Utah. In 1983 Transwestern was acquired by Horizon Air.

Destinations
From its hub at Salt Lake City, the carrier served the following destinations at various times during its existence:
Colorado
Grand Junction
Idaho
Boise
Idaho Falls
Pocatello 
Sun Valley (Hailey)
Twin Falls
Utah
Salt Lake City - Hub & airline headquarters
Blanding
Logan
Moab
Monticello
Price 
Provo
Roosevelt
Vernal 
Wyoming
Jackson Hole
Rock Springs

Transwestern also flew from Denver to Santa Fe and Albuquerque, New Mexico in 1977 and 1978.

Fleet
The Transwestern Airlines fleet consisted of the following aircraft:

 7 Beechcraft 99 Airliner
 1 Convair CV-580
 1 Fairchild Swearingen Metro III
 Piper Chieftain

Accidents
A non-fatality accident in Idaho occurred on its route on February 15, 1983, on a late morning flight from Boise to Sun Valley. Eight were injured, seven seriously. The control rod connection had separated; poor maintenance procedure using a non-standard bolt was cited as the cause.

See also 
 List of defunct airlines of the United States

References 

Defunct regional airlines of the United States
Airlines disestablished in 1983
Defunct companies based in Utah
1977 establishments in Utah
1983 disestablishments in Utah
Airlines established in 1977
Defunct airlines of the United States